ŽFK Napredak Kruševac is a Serbian women's football club from Kruševac founded in 1989. It has won one Serbian league and three Serbian cups including a double in 2007. It has played three more cup finals since, but lost them. Most recently, it was second in both competitions in 2013.

In its only appearance to date in the UEFA Champions League to date Napredak didn't make it past the qualifying stage.

Honours

Titles
 1 Serbian League: 2007
 3 Serbian Cups: 2004, 2005, 2007

UEFA competition record

References

Women's football clubs in Serbia
Sport in Kruševac
1989 establishments in Serbia
Association football clubs established in 1989